Toceranib is a receptor tyrosine kinase inhibitor and is used in the treatment of canine mast cell tumor also called mastocytoma. Together with masitinib (Kinavet (US)/Masivet (EU/ROW) by AB Science), toceranib is the only dog-specific anti-cancer drug approved by the U.S. Food and Drug Administration (FDA). It is sold under the brand name Palladia as its phosphate salt, toceranib phosphate (INN) by Pfizer. It was developed by SUGEN as SU11654, a sister compound to sunitinib, which was later approved for human therapies. Toceranib is likely to act mostly through inhibition of the kit tyrosine kinase, though it may also have an anti-angiogenic effect.

References

External links
 

Receptor tyrosine kinase inhibitors
Fluoroarenes
Indoles
Pfizer brands
Pyrroles
Carboxamides
Pyrrolidines
Dog medications